"Rosebud" is a song by Manic Street Preachers originally meant to be released as a part of their 2001 album Know Your Enemy until the band only released one album as opposed to the original two that were planned, cutting out another unreleased song "Studies in Paralysis". It was released on 22 July 2022, along with its music video directed by Kieran Evans. The music video contains 1970s footage from the BBC archive.

Release

The song was released on 22 July 2022.

In reference to the song, Louder Than War said "With its ringing guitars and electronic organ in the chorus, the song has a distinct Britpop flavour. Fittingly, the accompanying video induces nostalgia"

Elsewhere, XS Noize said "Beginning all wiry and cracked, ‘Rosebud’ soon opens out into a stuttering Hammond organ riff, a pensive rhythm track and a lyric that regrets “most things I never finished”."

Personnel
Manic Street Preachers
 James Dean Bradfield – lead vocals, guitar
 Nicky Wire – bass guitar
 Sean Moore – drums

References

Manic Street Preachers songs
2022 singles
2001 songs
Songs written by Nicky Wire
Songs written by James Dean Bradfield
Songs written by Sean Moore (musician)
Song recordings produced by Dave Eringa